Nature Alive is a   Local Nature Reserve northern outskirts of Coalville in Leicestershire. It is owned and managed by North West Leicestershire District Council.

This site was formerly a coal stocking yard for Snibston Colliery, and it now has diverse habitats such as woodland, ponds, a wildflower meadow, rough pasture and hedges. Fauna include water voles and great crested newts.

There is access from Stephenson Way and Brunel Way.

References

Local Nature Reserves in Leicestershire